Yatindra Mishra is an Indian poet, editor, and music and cinema scholar.

Career
Mishra has published four collections of Hindi poetry: Yada-Kada (1997), Ayodhya Tatha Anya Kavitayen (1999), and Dyorhi Par Aalaap (2005).

He has also written Devpriya (2007) and Sur Ki Baradari (2009) about the life and work of thumri singer Girija Devi, dancer Sonal Mansingh and shehnai maestro Ustad Bismillah Khan. Vismaya Ka Bhakhan (2012) is an essay compilation on music and arts.

He has edited selections from the poetry of Ajneya-Jitna Tumhara Sach Hai (2011), prose of Ashok Vajpeyee Kis Bhugol Mein Kis Sapne Mein (2011) and Poetry Hum Apna Vasant Pahchante Hain (2014), Poetry of Gulzar Yaar Julaahe (2009). He has also presented a selection of Gulzar's film lyrics, Meelon Se Din (2010).

He has translated ‘Girija’ into English and 'Vibhas', Ayodhya series of poems (German), ‘Yaar Julahey’ and 'Meelon Se Din' in Urdu.

Lectures
'Musical Intricacy of Paakeezah (Film)', Mahindra Sanatkada Luow Festival, 2015.

References

External links
 Yatindra Mishra Pratilipi

Year of birth missing (living people)
Poets from Uttar Pradesh
Living people
20th-century Indian poets
21st-century Indian poets
Indian male poets
Hindi-language writers
20th-century Indian male writers
21st-century Indian male writers